The Yonai Cabinet is the 37th Cabinet of Japan led by Mitsumasa Yonai from January 16, 1940, to July 22, 1940.

Cabinet

References 

Cabinet of Japan
1940 establishments in Japan
Cabinets established in 1940
Cabinets disestablished in 1940